Richard Hönigswald (18 July 1875 in Magyar-Óvár in the Austro-Hungarian Empire (the present Mosonmagyaróvár in Hungary) – 11 June 1947 in New Haven, Connecticut) was a well-known philosopher belonging to the wider circle of neo-Kantianism.

Biography
Hönigswald studied medicine and philosophy under Alois Riehl and Alexius von Meinong and from 1916 was professor of philosophy, psychology and pedagogy in Breslau (now Wrocław). There he supervised Norbert Elias's doctorate up to its conclusion in 1924. He also influenced Hans-Georg Gadamer towards philosophy after the latter attended a seminar Hönigswald conducted on the philosophy of language. From 1930 he was a professor at Munich.  The emphasis of his work lay on the theory of cognition from the point of view of validation and the philosophy of language. Beyond that, Hönigswald tried to develop a method of teaching that would be applicable to the natural sciences and the humanities equally. He also dealt with questions of the psychology of thought and of pedagogy.

In 1933, as a Jew, he was compulsorily retired after the Law for the Restoration of Professional Civil Service was passed in Germany. At the time of the Kristallnacht (The Night of Broken Glass) in 1938, he spent three weeks in Dachau concentration camp. In 1939 he emigrated with his wife and daughter by way of Switzerland to the United States.

The discovery of the collection of Hönigswald's unpublished writings led to the so-called third phase of Neo-Kantianism after the phases launched by Hermann Cohen and Paul Natorp (epistemological phase) and Heinrich Rickert, Wilhelm Windelband, and Emil Lask (ontological-theoretical phase), respectively.

References 

 Schmied-Kowarzik, Wolfdietrich (ed.), Erkennen - Monas - Sprache. Internationales Richard-Hönigswald-Symposion Kassel 1995 (Würzburg 1997).
 Zeidler, Kurt Walter, Kritische Dialektik und Transzendentalontologie. Der Ausgang des Neukantianismus und die post-neukantianische Systematik R. Hönigswalds, W. Cramers, B. Bauchs, H. Wagners, R. Reinigers und E. Heintels (Bonn 1995). 
 This article is translated from that on the German Wikipedia

External links 
 
 Archiv für Systematische Philosophie, incl list of works

1875 births
1947 deaths
19th-century essayists
19th-century American non-fiction writers
19th-century American philosophers
19th-century philosophers
20th-century essayists
20th-century American non-fiction writers
20th-century American philosophers
20th-century Hungarian philosophers
American male essayists
American male non-fiction writers
American Jews
American people of Hungarian-Jewish descent
Dachau concentration camp survivors
Epistemologists
Hungarian essayists
Hungarian expatriates in Germany
Hungarian Jews
Hungarian philosophers
Jewish philosophers
Kantian philosophers
Metaphysicians
Ontologists
People from Mosonmagyaróvár
Philosophers of language
Philosophers of psychology
Philosophy academics
Philosophy writers
20th-century American male writers